Matters of The Heart is a 1993 Ghanaian love story. This love story was one that brought couples together and they enjoy themselves as they watch the movie.

Plot
The movie emphasised on two love birds who were madly in love with each other. Nico in the movie was deeply in love with Sekina. Nico's family would not agree to the relationship between the two love birds. The reason was Sekina was from a very poor background and Nico was from a wealthy family and his family won't agree with their relationship.

Cast
Grace Omaboe
Alexandra Duah
Augustine Abbey (Idikoko)
Grace Nortey
Enoch Botchway
Mac Jordan Amartey
Adwoa Smart
Sheila Nortey
Sarah Boison
Raymond Kudzawu-D'Pherdd

References 

Ghanaian drama films
1993 films
1990s English-language films
English-language Ghanaian films